Jonathan Adler (born August 11, 1966 in Bridgeton New Jersey) is an American potter, interior decorator, and author. Adler launched his first ceramic collection in 1993 at Barneys New York. Five years later he expanded into home furnishings, opening his first namesake boutique in Soho, Manhattan. He now has 17 stores and runs an eponymous home interiors business.

Early life and education
After growing up in Bridgeton, New Jersey, Adler discovered an interest in pottery at summer camp when he was 12 years old. This interest in pottery was further enhanced by his father's own interest in pottery as a hobby he pursued in Philadelphia, while remaining in Bridgeton to practice law for a career. When Jonathan later attended Brown University, he studied  semiotics and art history, but spent most of his time at the nearby Rhode Island School of Design making pots. His RISD pottery, including Chanel inspired teapots and Sevres inspired urns, reflected his interests in pop culture, early hip hop culture, contemporary art, and fashion. His professor told him: "You have no talent, you need to leave and give up on your dreams and go become a lawyer."

Career
After graduating, he spent three years as an assistant in the entertainment industry before returning to pottery, despite his former teacher's disapproval. He said in a 2013 interview that "...every creative person, and every craftsperson, should have a naysayer to rebel against."

In 1990, Adler started teaching classes at Mud, Sweat 'n' Tears in New York City in exchange for free studio space. With those pots on hand, he cold-called the buyers from Barneys New York, received an order, and became a full-time production potter. In 1993 he founded Jonathan Adler Enterprises LLC.

He started as a production potter,  producing on his own for years.  He later worked with Aid to Artisans, a non-profit organization that works to help artisans in developing countries by connecting them with decorators in America. While in Peru visiting pottery studios, he was inspired by South American textiles and started designing pillows, throws, and rugs inspired by the work he found there.

Adler opened his first store in SoHo, Manhattan in 1998 and today his designs are sold in 30 stores and over 1,000 retailers. His designs include pots and sofas.

Adler has handled the interior decorator work of several commercial and residential projects. In 2004, he styled the Parker Palm Springs Hotel, the former Merv Griffin's Resort and Givenchy Spa property in Palm Springs, California. In 2016, he redesigned the hotel, extensively redoing the property including installing a seven-foot-tall bronze banana  on the main lawn.

Other projects include 225 Rector Place, Abington House (on the High Line), multiple Related Property apartment designs and a 2015 overhaul of the rooms, hallways, and outdoor areas at Eau Palm Beach.

He speaks at home interior industry events and design-centric museums, such as IDS, IDS West, KBIS, and the Mint Museum. He has appeared as a guest on Good Morning America, The Oprah Winfrey Show, and several other national programs.

On February 28, 2020, Jonathan Adler announced that he would be designing luxury cabanas for the Dreamworks Waterpark located at American Dream in East Rutherford, New Jersey, the waterpark opened on October 1, 2020, but the cabanas opened on  December 9, 2020.

Personal life 
In September 2008, Adler married his partner, Simon Doonan, in California. Doonan and Adler live in an apartment in Greenwich Village, and a house on Shelter Island.

Adler first publicly expressed his support for same-sex marriage in 2009. and works with various organizations to support LGBT rights. Both he and Doonan have filmed videos for Dan Savage's "It Gets Better Project".

Published works 
My Prescription for Anti-depressive Living, 2005, New York: HarperCollins, 
Jonathan Adler on Happy Chic Accessorizing, 2010, New York: Sterling Publishing, 
Jonathan Adler on Happy Chic Colors, 2010, New York: Sterling Publishing, 
100 Ways to Happy Chic Your Life, 2012, York: Sterling Publishing,

Filmography
2007: Top Design season 1, Bravo network, judge for all ten episodes
2008: Top Design season 2, Bravo network, judge for all ten episodes
2021: Design Star: Next Gen season 1, HGTV, judge for all six episodes

References

External links

1966 births
Artists from New Jersey
Artists from New York City
American gay writers
American gay artists
Gay Jews
LGBT people from New Jersey
LGBT people from New York (state)
American LGBT rights activists
Living people
People from Bridgeton, New Jersey
Writers from New Jersey
People from Greenwich Village